Summer of Sorcery is the seventh solo studio album by American singer-songwriter Little Steven, released under the name Little Steven and the Disciples of Soul. It was released on May 3, 2019 under Universal Music Enterprises. It is Little Steven's first album of new material since 1999's Born Again Savage. The album consists of 10 new songs plus a reworking of "Education" from his 1989 Revolution album, and the outtake "Suddenly You" from the Lilyhammer score.

Critical reception

Track listing

Personnel
Little Steven and the Disciples of Soul
 Steven Van Zandt – vocals, guitar, arranger
 Marc Ribler – electric guitar, acoustic guitar, music director 
 Andy Burton – B3 Hammond organ, piano, synthesizer
 Lowell "Banana" Levinger – piano, Wurlitzer electric piano
 Jack Daley – bass  
 Rich Mercurio – drums 
 Anthony Almonte – percussion  
 Eddie Manion – baritone saxophone, horn director 
 Stan Harrison – tenor saxophone, flute 
 Clark Gayton – trombone
 Ravi Best – trumpet 
 Ron Tooley – trumpet
 Jessie Wagner – backing vocals 
 Sara Devine – backing vocals
 Tania Jones – backing vocals
 The Disciples of Soul – additional backing vocals, handclaps
Additional musicians
 Yeissonn Villamar – piano, backing vocals (track 2)
 Jorge González – bongos, cowbell, backing vocals (track 2)
 Juan Gerena – guiro, backing vocals (track 2)
 Luisito Quintero – timbales, backing vocals (track 2)
 Ryan Celli – backing vocals (track 2)
 Jonathan Dinklage – violin, viola (tracks 3-5, 12)
 Anja Wood – cello (tracks 3-5, 12)
 Joel Feitzinger – synth programming, vibraslap (track 4)
 Gary Trew – backing vocals, handclaps (track 8) 
 Michael Wolf – keyboards (track 10)
 Matt McDonald – trombone (track 11)
 Duane Eddy – guitar (track 12)
 Sergio Ruelas Jr. – guitar (track 12)

Technical
 Steven Van Zandt – producer
 Geoff Sanoff – co-producer 
 Marc Ribler – co-producer
 Joel Feitzinger – assistant co-producer
 Bob Clearmountain – mixing
 Sergio Ruelas Jr. – mixing assistant 
 Bob Ludwig – mastering
 Louis Arzonico – art direction, design 
 Carlo Massarini – sleeve photography 
 Jeff Ross – back cover photography
 Ryan Celli – gatefold photography

Charts

References

2019 albums
Steven Van Zandt albums
Albums produced by Steven Van Zandt